Peter Patzak (2 January 1945 – 11 March 2021) was an Austrian film director and screenwriter. He directed 60 films from 1973 to 2021. His film Kassbach – Ein Porträt was entered into the 29th Berlin International Film Festival and his film Wahnfried was screened out of competition at the 1987 Cannes Film Festival. His 1997 film Shanghai 1937 was entered into the 20th Moscow International Film Festival.

Selected filmography

 Situation (1974)
 Parapsycho – Spectrum of Fear (1975)
 Kottan ermittelt (1976–1983, TV series)
  (1976)
 The Unicorn (1978, based on a novel by Martin Walser)
  (1979, TV film)
 Kassbach – Ein Porträt (1979)
  (1981)
 Tramps (1983)
  (1984)
 Die Försterbuben (1984, TV film, based on a novel by Peter Rosegger)
 Wahnfried (1986, film about Richard Wagner)
 Lethal Obsession (1987)
 Camillo Castiglioni oder die Moral der Haifische (1988, TV film about Camillo Castiglioni)
 Midnight Cop (1988)
 Frau Berta Garlan (1989, TV film, based on a novel by Arthur Schnitzler)
 Gavre Princip – Himmel unter Steinen (1990, film about Gavrilo Princip, based on a novel by Hans Koning)
 Lex Minister (1990)
 St. Petri Schnee (1991, TV film, based on a novel by Leo Perutz)
 Rochade (1992, TV film, based on a novel by Ladislav Mňačko)
 Im Kreis der Iris (1992, TV film, based on a story by Franz Nabl)
 Das Babylon Komplott (1993, TV film)
 1945 (1994, TV film)
 Deadly Obsession (1994, TV film)
 Jenseits der Brandung (1995, TV film)
 Brennendes Herz (1996, based on the memoirs of Gustav Regler)
 Shanghai 1937 (1997, TV film, based on a novel by Vicki Baum)
 Murderous Legacy (1998, TV film)
 Butterfly Feelings (1998, TV film)
 Sweet Little Sixteen (1999, TV film)
 Die Entführung (1999, TV film)
  (1999, TV film)
 Der Mörder in dir (2000, TV film)
  – Adeus und Goodbye (2001, TV documentary series episode)
  (2002, TV film)
 Die Wasserfälle von Slunj (2002, TV film, based on a novel by Heimito von Doderer)
 Herz ohne Krone (2003, TV film)
 Verliebte Diebe (2003, TV film)
 Sternzeichen (2003)
 Rufer, der Wolf (2005, TV film)
 Rien ne va plus (2010)

References

External links
 

1945 births
2021 deaths
Austrian film directors
Austrian television directors
Austrian screenwriters
Austrian male screenwriters
Film people from Vienna